UH–Downtown is a station on the METRORail Red Line in Houston, Texas (USA) and it is the former northern terminus of the Red Line, since the line was extended in late 2013. The station is located on top of the Main Street viaduct at the campus of the University of Houston–Downtown (UHD).

This station is located on top of the Main Street viaduct. Due to space limitations, it has an extremely narrow platform. As a result, the ticket vending machines are located on the property of the University of Houston–Downtown.

Bus connections 
A bus stop is located just north of the platform. Connecting bus routes are:
   1 Hospital
   5 Kashmere Gardens/Southmore
   9 North Main/Gulfton
   15 Fulton
   24 Northline
   52 Hirsch/Scott
   60 South MacGregor
   137 Northshore Limited

Points of interest 
The One Main Building (formerly Merchants and Manufacturers Building) and Willow Street Pump Station are listed on the National Register of Historic Places.  Both buildings are located on the campus of the University of Houston–Downtown (UHD).  

The One Main Building is adjacent to the METRORail station at 1 Main Street.  The Willow Street Pump Station is within walking distance at 811 N. San Jacinto Street.

Allen's Landing—the birthplace of the city of Houston—is at the confluence of White Oak Bayou and Buffalo Bayou, and Allen's Landing Park is adjacent to the University of Houston–Downtown.

From 2004 to 2013, this station was the northernmost point in the Metro Red Line.

References

External Links 
This page's main reference is www.ridemetro.org, Houston METRO's Official Website.

METRORail stations
METRORail
Railway stations in the United States opened in 2004
Railway stations in Texas at university and college campuses
University and college bus systems
2004 establishments in Texas
Railway stations in Harris County, Texas